Amphimoea is a monotypic moth genus in the family Sphingidae erected by Walter Rothschild and Karl Jordan in 1903. Its only species, Amphimoea walkeri, the Darwin hawkmoth, described by Jean Baptiste Boisduval in 1875, is found from Mexico south to Argentina.

Description 
The wingspan is 147–164 mm. Adults are on wing year round. They have the longest insect proboscis in the world and nectar from deep-throated flowers while hovering in the air.

Biology 
The larvae feed on Anaxagorea crassipetala.

Gallery

References

Sphingini
Monotypic moth genera
Moths described in 1875
Moths of North America
Sphingidae of South America
Taxa named by Walter Rothschild
Taxa named by Karl Jordan
Taxa named by Jean Baptiste Boisduval